Leslie Perkins Snow (October 19, 1862 – March 16, 1934) was a justice of the New Hampshire Supreme Court from 1921 to 1932.

Biography
Leslie Perkins Snow was born in Eaton, New Hampshire on October 19, 1862. He became a schoolteacher by the age of 16. He received a BA from Dartmouth College and a law degree from George Washington University (then called Columbian College) in 1891. He gained admission to the bar in Maryland in 1891, and in New Hampshire the following year. He became prominent in law and business.

A Republican, Snow was a member of the New Hampshire House of Representatives from 1887 to 1888.

He married Susan E. Currier on November 28, 1888, and they had two children. She died on June 6, 1892, and he remarried to her sister Norma C. Currier on June 27, 1894.

In 1919, he was president of the New Hampshire Bar Association. Snow served in the New Hampshire Senate, becoming President of the Senate by 1921. On April 8, 1921, Governor Albert O. Brown announced Snow's nomination to the state supreme court.

Snow retired from the court in 1932 at the mandatory age of 70, and died at his home in Rochester from a heart attack on March 16, 1934.

References

1862 births
1934 deaths
People from Carroll County, New Hampshire
George Washington University Law School alumni
New Hampshire state senators
Justices of the New Hampshire Supreme Court
Republican Party members of the New Hampshire House of Representatives